"Your Guardian Angel" is a song by the band The Red Jumpsuit Apparatus. There are two different versions - a mostly acoustic version found on their first major-label album, Don't You Fake It, and a completely acoustic version (title "The Acoustic Song") on their demo album. "Your Guardian Angel" was released to radio on August 7, 2007. It is the third single released by the band, with the video released on October 15, 2007. It was featured in the season finale of the CBS show Moonlight titled "Mortal Cure". According to Ronnie Winter, the song is dedicated to the eight students that lost their lives in the March 1, 2007 tornado that destroyed a high school in Enterprise, Alabama. The song was even the school's prom theme that year.

The album version has 90 seconds of silence at the end, which leads into the unlisted 12th track; "The Grim Goodbye".

Music video
The music video for "Your Guardian Angel" shows Ronnie Winter turning on many lightbulbs, and singing the song in a closet with one light bulb, then he plays and sings while the band is preparing for a concert. They perform in front of the crowd of fans with flashy light effects during the distortion part. Winter turns off the lightbulb at the end of the song. The video was directed by Shane Drake who has done work for other bands such as Panic! at the Disco and Paramore.

Credits
This song  was written and composed by Ronnie Winter.

Chart performance

References

2006 songs
2007 singles
The Red Jumpsuit Apparatus songs
Virgin Records singles
Rock ballads
Music videos directed by Shane Drake
Song recordings produced by David Bendeth
2000s ballads